The Last Dragon is a children's fantasy novel by Silvana De Mari, first published in Italy in 2004 under the title L'ultimo elfo. Set in a post-apocalyptic world, it follows the journey of the last elf as he seeks out the last dragon so that the world can be renewed. Translated into English by Shaun Whiteside, it was published in the US by Miramax Books in 2006. It has also been published in the UK as The Last Elf.

The author
Silvana De Mari, born in 1953 in Caserta, Italy, is a writer, psychotherapist, and doctor. She lives in Turin with her family. She has a private psychotherapy practice, and formerly worked as a surgeon in both Italy and Ethiopia. L'ultimo elfo, her third children's book, was the first to be translated into English. It has also been translated into French, German, Spanish, Portuguese, and several other languages.

Plot summary

In a two-part tale, the reader embarks on a journey of humor, sorrow, and tenderness, within a story of cultures colliding, highlighting a young orphaned elf, the last on earth, named Yorsh, full name Yorshkrunsquarklejolnerstrink. His village has been destroyed by torrential rain, and he finds himself living in a world plagued by intolerance, shrouded in darkness, hungry, cold, and wet. Upon meeting and being reluctantly befriended by a hunter named Monser and Sajra, a woman, Yorsh learns of a prophecy and of his importance in saving the world of this Dark Age. To fulfill the prophecy and bring the world into an age where the sun will shine again, he must first find another bereaved creature: the last dragon. Upon discovering the dragon, Yorsh decides to stay and keep him company.

The second part of the story takes place thirteen years later; the dragon dies leaving him with an egg. Yorsh takes upon the task of raising the young dragon. Yorsh, coming to miss deeply his companions, Monser and Sajra, journeys back to the old village to find their daughter Robi, and learns of the hanging they endured for protecting him. Saddened, Yorsh decides he will protect the young orphaned Robi. Deciding to leave, the elf, young dragon, and Robi move to a new country, forming a new constitution to govern the population of their new world, “No one can hit anybody… And you can’t hang people, either.”

Sequels
The story of Yorsh continues in L'ultimo orco (The Last Ogre), published in Italy in 2005. Further books in the saga are Gli ultimi incantesimi (The Last Spells) (2008) and L'ultima profezia (The Last Prophecy) (2010). The sequels have not as yet been published in English language editions.

Selected editions
Italian
L'ultimo elfo, Adriano Salani Editore, 2004

French
Le Dernier Elfe tr. Jacques Barbéri, Éditions Albin Michel, 2005

Spanish
El último elfo, tr. Lina Patricia Bojanini, Belacqua, 2005

Latvian
Pēdējais elfs, tr. Dace Meiere, Dienas Grāmata, 2006

English
The Last Dragon, tr. Shaun Whiteside, Miramax Books, 2006 (US edition)
The Last Elf, tr. Shaun Whiteside, Bloomsbury Publishing, 2007 (UK edition)
The Last Dragon, audio edition, read by Patricia Connolly, Recorded Editions, 2007

Portuguese
O Último Elfo, tr. José Neto, ASA Editores, 2007

German
Der letzte Elf, tr. Barbara Kleiner, cbj, 2008

Lithuanian
Paskutinis elfas, tr.Laura Vilkaitė, Nieko rimto, 2014

Distributors
 HarperCollins Publishers (United States)
 HarperCollins Canada, Limited (Canada)
 Hyperion Press (United States)
 Turnaround Publisher Services Limited (United Kingdom)
 HarperCollins Publishers Australia (Australia)

Awards
 Premio Andersen, 2004
 Premio Bancarellino, 2005
 Kirkus Star
 Mildred L. Batchelder Award 2007 (Nominated) 
 Maine Student Book Award 2007 (Nominated) 
 Nutmeg Children's Book Award 2011 (Nominated)

Quotation

"The Human was extremely tall. On its head it had yellowish hair coiled like a rope. It had no hair on its face. And yet his grandmother had been very categorical about that. Humans have hair on their faces. It's called a beard. Its one of the many things that distinguish them from elves. The little elf concentrated, trying to remember, then it came to him.

"You must be a female man," he concluded triumphantly.

"The word is woman, fool," said the human.

"Oh, sorry, sorry, woman-fool, I be more careful, I call right name, woman-fool"...."

References

External links
Author's website 
Salani Foreign Rights Catalogue (page 6) 

2004 novels
Children's fantasy novels
Italian children's literature
Italian fantasy novels
Post-apocalyptic novels
Novels about dragons
2004 children's books
Elves in popular culture